Estonia–India relations refers to the bilateral diplomatic relations between Estonia and India. India first recognised Estonia on 22 September 1921 when the former had just acquired membership in the League of Nations. India re-recognised Estonia on 9 September 1991 and diplomatic relations were established on 2 December of the same year in Helsinki. Estonia is represented in India by its embassy in New Delhi and its honorary consulate in Mumbai. India is represented in Estonia through its embassy in Helsinki (Finland) and through an honorary consulate in Tallinn.

On 30 December 2020, the Union Cabinet of India approved the opening an embassy in Estonia.

Official visits 
To India:
 October 1993 – Trivimi Velliste, the Foreign Minister
 February 1999 – State visit of Lennart Meri, the President
 November 2008 – Urmas Paet, the Foreign Minister
 September 2012 – the Estonian Minister of Education with Senior Delegation from all three major universities of Estonia visit organised by Unica Solutions Ltd. Estonia Education open day was held at Hilton Mumbai.

To Estonia:
 August 1995 – Salman Khurshid, the Minister of State for External Affairs
 2001 – Minister of External Affairs, Ranjit Singh Kalha, and Estonia's Foreign Minister Toomas Hendrik Ilves meet to discuss cooperation in combating terrorism.
 November 2003 – Digvijay Singh, the Minister of State for External Affairs

Indian Embassy
The Embassy of India in Tallinn is the upcoming diplomatic mission of the Republic of India to Estonia.

History
Estonia has been under the jurisdiction of Embassy of India in Helsinki since 1991. In 2012, a "visa representation centre" was established in the town hall square of Tallinn, with then Estonian foreign minister Urmas Paet declaring that Estonia would establish an embassy in New Delhi soon after. Plan to set up a new resident embassy in Estonia was announced 30 December 2020.

Ambassador
Raveesh Kumar is the current Indian Ambassador to Estonia.

Trade 
In 2007, India was Estonia's 34th largest import partner and 37th largest export partner. Imports into Estonia doubled in 2006. The total value of trade between the countries in 2007 was €30.8 million.

While Indian investment in Estonia is small-scale and is in the commercial and food sector, Estonia has no direct investment in India. However, Estonian Foreign Minister Urmas Paet has expressed desire to improve economic ties and appoint a non-resident ambassador and open its own embassy besides two existing honorary embassies.

India has signed the Joint Business Council Agreement with the Estonian Chamber of Commerce.

Cultural 
The first person from Estonia to visit India at the end of the 17th century was the cleric Eberhard Eckhold (Eckholz) who was born in Tallinn and had studied in the Academia Gustaviana of Tartu. Nothing particular is known about his visit. Adam Johann von Krusenstern's expedition visited India on his way to China in 1797–1798 during the first Russian circumnavigation. He stayed for short whiles in Madras and Calcutta, acquainted with the commercial and administrative activity of the East India Company and made a two-month journey on board HMS Orpheus in the Bay of Bengal. The fact that Krusenstern's library contained around forty items on the history and geography of India and on the Sanskrit literature shows his great interest towards the country.

The first Estonian textbooks to mention India were written by Georg Gottfried Marpurg (1805) and Karl Ernst Berg (1811).
The first Estonian publication to arrive in India was Pühhapäiwa Wahhe-luggemissed (Sunday Intermediary Readings) of Otto Wilhelm Masing (1818). The book contained a hundred-page description of the nature and society of India. Sanskrit language publications were printed at the University of Tartu and from 1837, Sanskrit teaching classes commenced, taught by professor Karl Friedrich Keil. One of his successors Leopold Alexander von Schroeder became an outstanding indologist, known for his translations and original studies on the early Indian literature.

Several papers on the missionary work in India, especially among the Tamils were published in the middle of the 19th century. "Maailma maade õpetus" (Lesson on Countries of the World) by Berend Gildenmann gave a short systematic overview of the geography of India, improved by the editions of 1854 and 1868. Johann Voldemar Jannsen's articles on India which were widely popular contributed further to the Estonians' knowledge on the country as he published up-to-date information on the course of the Indian Rebellion of 1857. Further impact in the knowledge was made by the intellectuals Friedrich Reinhold Kreutzwald, Voldemar Hansen, Eduard Friedrich Lossius and others. The first atlas in Estonian "Maakaardi raamat", published in 1857, contained a map of India under the title of Indo-Brittia Riik (Indo-Britain State), populated by toponyms from Masing's and Jannsen's publications.

Several protestant missionaries from Estonia contributed in India. The first one was Arnold Nerling who worked among the Tamils in 1862–1872. Born in Reval, Franz Mathissen studied in the school of the Basel Mission, was sent to work in Calcutta in 1867 and stayed there for the rest of his life. His schoolmate Johannes Hesse from Weissenstein was sent to work in the mountains by Nilagiri in 1869–1874. Albert Grubert from Ahrensburg who had studied in Leipzig, worked in 1871–1876 in Nagapatnam. While they were Baltic Germans, the only missionary of Estonian ethnicity was Christoph Bransfeld from Kärdla who worked with the Gossner Theological College in 1880–1896.

By the late 19th century, India was widely known to Estonians. In addition to the textbooks and the press, brochures were issued on the mission, the Rebellion of 1857, Nana Sahib (1884), the Great Famine of 1876–78 (1892), the hinduism (1892), the British Raj (1895) and more. These were supported by the letters of the missionaries in India published by the Estonian press.

Playing Indian music has become a tradition in the Estonian film festival Orient. Veena player Dr.Mustafa Raza has performed in the festival three times.

The Estonian-Indian Cultural Society was established in 2004 and since then has made regular donations to the Estonian Institute of Humanities, the National Library of Estonia and the University of Tartu.

Political 
The Estonian–Indian Parliament Group was established in the Riigikogu in 2004. Estonia has supported India's bid for a permanent seat in the United Nations Security Council. Estonia also supports the Indian draft on Comprehensive Convention on International Terrorism (CCIT) in the United Nations.

Science 
In a collaboration with Center for Cellular and Molecular Biology, CCMB, Hyderabad, India, Estonian Biocentre and University of Tartu has published dozens of papers on origin and migrations of South Asian populations. Apart from these many Indian students and researchers are working currently in University of Tartu and Tallinn University of Technology. Gyaneshwer Chaubey was the first Indian student in University of Tartu defended his PhD theses in 2010. Later in 2015, Chandana Basu became the first female Indian student to complete her PhD.

Agreements 
Estonia and India have several agreements on co-operations on subjects varying from Science and Technology to Culture, Education, Science, Sports, Arts, Mass Media, Tourism and Youth Affairs. In 1999 India and Estonia signed a joint business council agreement to increase investment and trade between the two countries.
 Declaration of Principles and Directions of Co-operation between the Republic of Estonia and the Republic of India which came into force 15 October 1993
 Agreement on Co-operation in the Fields of Science and Technology which came into force on 6 August 1999
 Agreement on Co-operation in the Spheres of Culture, Education, Science, Sports, Arts, Mass Media, Tourism and Youth Affairs which came into force 11 November 1999
 Agreement on Economic and Technical Co-operation which came into force 13 March 2000
 Agreement on Trade and Economic Co-operation which came into force 24 August 2004

See also 
 Foreign relations of Estonia 
 Foreign relations of India
 India–European Union relations

References

External links

 Estonian Ministry of foreign Affairs about the relation with India
 Indian embassy in Helsinki (also accredited to Estonia)

 
India
Bilateral relations of India